Georg Andersen may refer to:
 Georg Andersen (athlete) (born 1963), Norwegian shot putter
 Georg Andersen (wrestler) (born 1887), American wrestler
 Georg Andersen (footballer) (1893–1974), Norwegian footballer

See also
 George Anderson (disambiguation)
 George Andersen (1900–1965), American lawyer